Tuxford is a village in the Canadian province of Saskatchewan within the Rural Municipality of Marquis No. 191 and Census Division No. 7. Highway 2, Highway 42 and Highway 202 all intersect in the community. Highway 202 connects the community to Buffalo Pound Provincial Park  to the east.

Founded in 1907, the community was named after General George Stuart Tuxford of the 3rd Canadian Infantry Brigade, 1st Canadian Division. The community celebrated its centennial in 2007.

History 
Tuxford incorporated as a village on July 19, 1907.

Demographics 

References 

Villages in Saskatchewan
Marquis No. 191, Saskatchewan
Division No. 7, Saskatchewan